Parectopa nesitis is a moth of the family Gracillariidae. It is known from Saint Thomas in the United States Virgin Islands.

References

Gracillariinae